Benjamin Morgan Cowie was Dean of Manchester and then Exeter, both in England, in the last quarter of the 19th century.

Born on 8 June 1816, he was educated at St John's College, Cambridge and graduated Senior Wrangler in 1839. Ordained in 1841 he was successively Tutor, Lecturer and Fellow at his old college. Afterwards he was  Vicar of St Lawrence Jewry followed by an 11-year spell in Manchester, followed by a further 17 at Exeter. He died on 3 May 1900.

Notes

1816 births
Alumni of St John's College, Cambridge
Fellows of St John's College, Cambridge
Deans of Manchester
Deans of Exeter
1900 deaths
Senior Wranglers